Amina Begum Bint al-Majlisi was a female Safavid mujtahideh. She was the daughter of the great Safavid religious scholar Mulla Muhammad Taqi Majlisi and granddaughter of the  mujtahideh Zubaiyda, who was in turn the daughter of the great philosopher Mulla Sadra. Amina's brother was Mulla Muhammad Baqir Majlisi, the author of the well-known work Bihar al-anvar, to which Amina contributed. She married a student of her father's, Mullah Muhammed Saleh Mazandarani. The family lived in Isfahan, the capital city of the Safavid Empire. The city of Isfahan has a long educational tradition of Shiite ‘Alimat (Islamic preachers) and Muhaddithat (traditionalists). The practice reached to a peak during the Safavid era.

Amina achieved considerable mastery of authoritative works in Shiite jurisprudence, such as the commentaries on Alfiyeh by Ibn Malik, Shawahid by al-Siyuti, as well as the al-Qava'id by Allameh Hilli. Many great Shiite scholars referred to her as Mujtahidah. The great Marja’ Agha Ahmad Behbahani in his book Mir’at ul ahval jahan nama declared that Amina was an ‘Alima and qualified Mujtahed (jami’ul sharayet) who wrote a book in Islamic jurisprudence (fiqh). The author of Riadhul ‘ulama, who was her contemporary and a pupil of Amina’s husband, described Amina as ‘Alima and Saliha'. He also asserted that she helped her husband to solve the difficulties of Al-Qava’id.

Amina's niece, named “Bint al-Azizullah” (daughter of Mulla Azizulla) was also a mujtahida.

Further reading
Ansari, Muhammad ibn ‘Abdullah, Tabaqatul Muhaddithin bi Esbihan val varidin ‘alaiha, 1988, Beirut.
Amin, Mustadrekat ‘A’yanu Shi’a, 1410H, Beirut.
Behbahani, Ahmad, Mir’atul Ahval, 1991, Tehran
Cole, Juan, Sacred Space And Holy War: The Politics, Culture and History of Shi'ite Islam. 2002, p. 61.
Effendi, ‘Abdullah, Riyadhul ‘Ulama va Hiyadhul fuzala, 1987, Mashhad.
Al-Hasun, Muhammad, A’lamu Nisa al-Muminat, 1411H, Qum
Mahallati, Sheikh Zhabihullah, Raiyahinu Shari’a, Tehran, 1991.
Tehrani, Agha Bozorg, Al-Zhari’a ila Tasanif al-Shi’a, 1983, Beirut
Zanuzi, Muhammad Hussain,  Riyadh ul janna, Qum. Mar’ashi Najafi library. 1998.

See also
Lady Amin
Zohreh Sefati
Iftikhār al-Tujjar
Zīnah al-Sādāt Humāyūnī

Iranian ayatollahs
Year of birth missing
Year of death missing
Women scholars of the medieval Islamic world
Iranian Muslim mystics